The 2016–17 Damehåndboldligaen (known as the Primo Tours Ligaen for sponsorship reasons) is the 81st season of the Damehåndboldligaen, Denmark's premier handball league.

Team information

The regular season

Standings

Results

Championship playoffs
! Best of three matches. In the case of a tie after the second match, a third match is played. Highest ranking team in the regular season has the home advantage in the first and possible third match.

Quarterfinal

Semifinal

Bronze Match

Final

Relegation playoff
! Best of three matches. In the case of a tie after the second match, a third match is played. Highest ranking team in the regular season has the home advantage in the first and possible third match.

Group 1

Group 2

Top goalscorers

Regular season

Overall

All Star Team
Goalkeeper:  Sabine Englert (FCM)
Left Wing:  Ann Grete Nørgaard (VHK)
Left Back:  Trine Troelsen (SIL)
Centre Back:  Mia Rej (KBH)
Pivot:  Mette Gravholt (NFH)
Right Back:  Nathalie Hagman (NFH)
Right Wing:  Jéssica Quintino (HCO)

References

External links
 Danish Handball Federaration 

Handboldligaen
Handboldligaen